Metasulenus unicolor is a species of beetle in the family Cerambycidae, and the only species in the genus Metasulenus. It was described by Breuning in 1970.

References

Desmiphorini
Beetles described in 1970